Elena Aristodimou (born 25 January 2002) is a Cypriot footballer who plays as a midfielder and has appeared for the Cyprus women's national team.

Career
Aristodimou has been capped for the Cyprus national team, appearing for the team during the UEFA Women's Euro 2021 qualifying cycle.

References

External links
 
 
 

2002 births
Living people
Cypriot women's footballers
Cyprus women's international footballers
Women's association football midfielders
Eskilstuna United DFF players